The 2010 WNBA Draft is the league's annual process for determining which teams receive the rights to negotiate with players entering the league. The draft was held on April 8, 2010. The first round was shown on ESPN2 (HD), while the second and third rounds were shown on NBA TV and ESPNU.

A lottery was held on November 5, 2009. The Minnesota Lynx received the first overall selection of the draft. The Sacramento Monarchs received the number two selection. The Connecticut Sun came up with the third overall selection, followed by the Minnesota Lynx again at four, and the Chicago Sky at number five.

Since the Monarchs folded after the draft lottery took place, their pick was simply eliminated.

Draft lottery
The lottery selection to determine the order of the top five picks in the 2010 Draft occurred on November 5, 2009 The Minnesota Lynx won the first pick, while the Sacramento Monarchs and Connecticut Sun were awarded the second and third picks respectively. The remaining first-round picks and all the second- and third-round picks were assigned to teams in reverse order of their win–loss records in the previous season.

Below were the chances for each team to get specific picks in the 2010 draft lottery, rounded to three decimal places:

Transactions
January 30, 2009: The Washington Mystics receive the second-round pick from the Minnesota Lynx as part of the Lindsey Harding transaction.
March 26, 2009: The Los Angeles Sparks receive the first-round pick from the Phoenix Mercury as part of the Temeka Johnson transaction.
May 5, 2009: The Minnesota Lynx receive the first-round pick from the New York Liberty (via L.A.) as part of the Sidney Spencer/Noelle Quinn transaction.
November 20, 2009: The league announces the folding of the Sacramento Monarchs. The Monarchs' picks in the draft were simply eliminated.
January 12, 2010: The Connecticut Sun receive the first overall pick in exchange for the second overall pick from the Minnesota Lynx as part of the Lindsay Whalen/Renee Montgomery transaction.
Source

Dispersal draft
On November 20, 2009, the league announced that the Sacramento Monarchs would no longer operate. A dispersal draft was held December 14, 2009 with teams being allowed to pick in the following order.

Key

College draft

Round 1

Round 2

Round 3

References

External links
2010 WNBA Draft Board

Women's National Basketball Association Draft
Draft